Hasangaya or Haykajur (also ) is a village in the Tartar District of Azerbaijan, in the disputed region of Nagorno-Karabakh. The village had an ethnic Armenian-majority population prior to the First Nagorno-Karabakh war when the village came under Azerbaijani control.

History 
During the Soviet period, the village was located in the Mardakert District of the former Nagorno-Karabakh Autonomous Oblast.

References

External links 
 

Populated places in Tartar District
Nagorno-Karabakh